Syed Muhammad Ashraf (SM Ashraf) is a Retd. Civil Servant (IRS)  and an Urdu novelist and short-story writer of distinction. He is first person to qualify civil service examination in Urdu language in India. He has written novels and several collections of short stories. Some of his stories have been translated into English and other languages. He has received the Sahitya Academy Award in 2004  and Aalmi Farogh-e-Urdu Adab Award by Majlis-e-Farogh-e-Urdu Qatar in 2018.

Life
He was born on 8 July 1957 at Sitapur, a town in Awadh region in UP,  he belongs to a family of devoted scholars  and  Sufi  saints  of Marehra Shareef in Etah district of U.P, India. His father and ancestors headed the Khaqah-e-Barkatiyya that has catered down the ages for the spiritual alleviation of irrespective of their caste, color or creed.

His elder brother Prof. Syed Muhammad Ameen Mian Qaudri is custodian of Marehra Shareef Dargah is counted among revered  and influential Sufis.
The 'Philanthropic spiritual ambience of his home instilled into the young Ashraf the value  system of Sufism love and brotherhood  and a concern especially for the poor, needy and those in distress. Another formative influence on the young Ashraf's mind was his easy, enviable access to the rich library of Barkatiah khanqah, housing  a  treasure  of  Urdu, 
Persian,  Arabic and  Sanskrit literary masterpieces.

Education
Ashraf's literary predilection was  developed  and  refined further, as he joined the Aligarh Muslim  University (AMU) for doing BA in Urdu literature. The AMU, acclaimed for its literary and  elocutionary contests, provided the perfect platform for the  blossoming  of Ashraf's creative genius. That he took a very prominent part in the co-curricular activities, particularly literary ones, is evident  from the  several coveted  posts he held at the AMU, ranging from Secretary, University Literary Club, Secretary AMU Great Books Club to Editor, Aftab Magazine.  Also,  he  was  the winner of various  prestigious Debating  Trophies. More importantly, notwithstanding his preoccupation with literary activities and writing stories which gained wide acclaim on the University campus, he kept earning the highest academic distinctions by standing first in  his BA (Hons.) and MA examinations and was awarded Gold Medals for his academic excellence. To crown it all, soon after obtaining his Master's degree he  appeared at  the  highly competitive  Civil Service Examinations and  set  a new record in the history of UPSC as  he took Urdu  as  the medium  of examination  and qualified Civil Service.

Career
In 1981 he joined Indian Revenue Service and in 1990, he was appointed as Joint Commissioner Income Tax, Kanpur 1992 and also established Sir Syed Public Schools in Kanpur and rose to be the first Income Tax Commissioner at Aligarh in 2007, after having served at important positions in the Income 'tax Department at Nagpur, Agra, Kanpur and Mumbai, presently he is posted as Commissioner of Income Tax in New Delhi.

Apart from discharging his professional duty, Ashraf holds the  cause  of education very dear to his hear. He has been instrumental in establishing educational institutions for the
underprivileged  in  Kanpur, Marehra and  Unnao and founding  the sprawling, top quality educational complex, Al-Barkaat Educational Institution at Aligarh that imparts the education of CBSE 10 +2/MBA/BE.d and  other  professions courses. Besides, he has delivered lectures on social, educational and cultural issues at the leading 'Indian universities and also at  the  Urdu  Festival  under the aegis  of University  of Virginia, USA.

Awards and Posts
In 2008, he was awarded membership of Bhasha Samiti for Saraswati Samman while in 2008 he was appointed as member, National Council for Promotion of Urdu Language (NCPUL). In recognition of his services in promoting of Urdu literature, Syed Mohammad Ashraf has been honoured with the highest literary awards in India including Sahitya Academy Award (2003), UP Urdu Academy Collective Services  Award (2013), Madhya Pardesh  Govt.’s ‘Iqbal Samman Award’ (2017) and ‘Katha award’ (1995).
He is founder Vice  President of Al-Barkat Educational Institutions and Jamia Al Barkaat Aligarh and Al-Barkaat Public School.

Works
Syed Muhammad Ashraf has shown his creativity in all his fiction stories, novels, poetry and non-fiction prose, which is unparalleled. Among his fiction books include ‘Dar se Bichrhe’ (1994), ‘Baad-e-Saba ka Intezar’ (2000), in novels ‘Mera man; Ek qissa suno’, ‘Number war ka Neela'(1997 ), ‘Murdar Khor’ and  ‘Aakhri Sawariyan’ got fame. Many of his novels have been translated into English, Hindi and other Indian languages. Moreover, he has also written the bio-graphy of his father, titled ‘Yaad-e-Hassan’ and published a collection of his naatia poetry titled ‘Sallo alehe waleh’. Many students of Jammu University, Aligarh Muslim University and Delhi University are doing M. Phil. on his novels ‘Dar se Bichrhe’ and  ‘Number dar ka Neela’.

His award winning novel ‘The Silence of the Hyena’ is an inextricable part of our daily lives. The real-life instances curated into the narrative of some stories flow quite smoothly, which makes for an interesting read. Using animals as metaphors, the award-winning writer Syed Muhammad Ashraf, who qualified the Indian Administrative Service in his mother tongue, Urdu, has tried to get into the recesses of the human heart.
His works include:

Daar Se Bichde
Baad-e-Saba Ka Intizar 
Aadmi
General knowledge se bahar ka Sawaal
Aakhri Ban-baas
Lakadbaggha Roya
Qurbani Ka Janwar
Andhaa Oont
Lakadbaggha Chup Ho Gaya
Qadeem Maabadon ka Muhafiz
Aakhri Mod Par
Lakadbaggha Hansa
Toofan

See also
Wasim Barelvi

References

Urdu-language poets
Living people
Year of birth missing (living people)
Recipients of the Sahitya Akademi Award in Urdu